AsiaSat 1 was a Hong Kong communications satellite, which was owned, and was operated, by the Hong Kong based Asia Satellite Telecommunications Company. It was positioned in geostationary orbit at a longitude of 100.5° East. It spent its operational life at 100.5° East, from where it was used to provide fixed satellite services, including broadcasting, audio and data transmission, to Asia and the Pacific Ocean.

Satellite description 
AsiaSat 1 was built by Hughes Space and Communications. It is based on the HS-376 satellite bus. It carries twenty four C-band transponders.

Launch 
The launch of AsiaSat 1 was contracted to the China Great Wall Industry Corporation (CGWIC), and used a Long March 3 launch vehicle. The launch was conducted from Xichang Launch Area 3 (LA-3) at the Xichang Satellite Launch Centre at 13:30:02 UTC on 7 April 1990.

Westar 6 
Westar 6 was launched from the space shuttle in February 1984. Its PAM-D misfired, however, and the satellite was stranded in a useless low orbit. It was retrieved by shuttle astronauts in November 1984, and Hughes was contracted to refurbish it. Westar 6 was eventually sold, for US$58 million, to the AsiaSat consortium and renamed AsiaSat 1.

Mission 
Asiasat 1 was replaced by AsiaSat 3S in May 1999.

See also

References 

Spacecraft launched in 1990
AsiaSat satellites
Satellites using the HS-376 bus
Spacecraft launched by Long March rockets